Gonocephalus chamaeleontinus, the chameleon forest dragon or chameleon anglehead lizard, is a species of agamid lizard from Indonesia and Malaysia.

Description 

This species lives in a humid tropical environment, in the forests of central Java. The lifestyle is close to that of the chameleons. The females are green, with the males bluer, with yellow touches.

References

External links 
 
 Gonocephalus chamaeleontinus, at Animal Diversity Web
 

Gonocephalus
Reptiles of Indonesia
Reptiles of the Malay Peninsula
Reptiles described in 1768
Taxa named by Josephus Nicolaus Laurenti
Fauna of Sumatra
Fauna of Java